Rosa Lluch Bramon (born 1969) is a Spanish historian, university professor, and academic secretary of the History and Archeology Department of the University of Barcelona.

Biography 
Born in 1969 in Barcelona, she is the daughter of Dolors Bramon and Ernest Lluch.

Bramon held the title interim university degree holder for the department of Medieval History, Paleography and Diplomacy for University of Barcelona in 1960. She graduated to a degree holder in 1992 with her research paper "El es remences de la Pia Almoina de la Seu de Girona". Bramon earned her PhD degree at the University of Girona in 2003 and now works as a professor of history at the University of Barcelona.

Regarding the April 2019 general election, she closed the En Comú Podem congressional list in Barcelona. She is running as Senatorial candidate for Barcelona vis-à-vis the November 2019 general election.

Works

References

External links 
Instituts de la UdG > Recerca Històrica > Membres > Rosa Lluch
Search works Catalog

1969 births
Living people
Spanish women historians
20th-century Spanish historians
21st-century Spanish historians
University of Barcelona alumni
University of Girona alumni
Academic staff of the University of Barcelona
Spanish women in politics
Women politicians from Catalonia
20th-century Spanish women writers